General elections were held in Bermuda on 24 July 2003. The result was a victory for the Progressive Labour Party, which won 22 of the 36 seats in the House of Assembly.

Results

References

Elections in Bermuda
Bermuda
2003 in Bermuda
Bermuda
July 2003 events in North America